Footwork, also called juke, footwork/juke or Chicago juke, is a genre of electronic music derived from ghetto house with elements of hip hop, first appearing in Chicago in the late 1990s. The music style evolved from the earlier, rapid rhythms of ghetto house, a change pioneered by RP Boo. It may draw from the rapid rhythms and sub-bass frequencies of drum & bass. Tracks also frequently feature heavily syncopated samples from rap, pop and other sources, and are often around 160 bpm.

Footwork is also a style of house dance, closely associated with juke music, and typified by very fast and chaotic feet moves.

Etymology
The name "footwork" given to the genre refers to the footwork dance that accompanies it and is characterized by very fast structured footwork (dance). The arguably first mention of the term "footwork" within the ghetto house scene of Chicago was WaxMaster's "Foot work" track in 1995. Footwerk and footwurk are two other forms of the term sometimes used to describe this genre.

The name juke is of unclear origin. It is believed to have originated from West African languages and came to Chicago use via Gullah. The term "juke" is believed to come from the Gullah word joog or jug, meaning rowdy or disorderly which itself is derived from the Wolof word dzug meaning to misconduct one's self.

The term juke, as being applied to particular styles of ghetto house, came into use from DJ Puncho and Gant-Man in the late 1990s by releasing tracks such as "Juke it" in 1997. Some originators of the footwork/juke genre, notable example being DJ Clent, at first disregarded the term, instead preferring to call footwork music project house. However, the term "juke" came to dominate the whole ghetto house scene, often being used as a blanket term to denote any style derived from ghetto house and even its progenitor, ghetto house, was at times called "juke" too.

The terms footwork and juke, as referring to the fast syncopated genre of electronic dance music derived from ghetto house, may be used interchangeably. Apart from simply being synonyms, there is also a strong tradition to distinguish these two terms, where juke is constrained to the earlier years of the genre, with footwork in this sense being a more chaotic, complex and abstract offshoot of proper juke music, that brought wider attention in the late 2000s. In this regard, as one review summarized, the situation with terms is analogous to jungle vs. drum'n'bass dispute, where some people consider the terms to be mere synonyms, while others prefer to call jungle a proper progenitor of drum'n'bass.

History
Footwork/juke first appeared in the late 1990s to early 2000s as a faster and increasingly abstract variant of ghetto house. The genre evolved to match the energy of footwork dance, a dance style born in the disparate ghettos, house parties and underground dance competitions of Chicago. RP Boo, a former footwork dancer, is generally credited with making the first songs that fall within the canon by releasing songs such as "Baby Come On" in 1997 which is oftentimes considered the founding track of footwork/juke. According to RP Boo, the first sign of the genre's emergence happened, when ghetto house first started to be played at a faster speed when a group of ghetto house DJs from the Chicago West Side started playing ghetto house records at 45 RPM instead of standard 33 RPM. Among other people involved in the creation footwork/juke sound were DJ Rashad (with his 1998 track called "Child Abuse" (with DJ Thadz)) and DJ Clent (with his 1996 track "Hail Mary" (with DJ Slugo) and 1998 track "3rd Wurle"). During that time, in 1998, DJ Clent formed a crew of him and the likely minded producers, namely, DJ Spinn, DJ Rashad, RP Boo, DJ C-Bit, Majik Myke and others, called "Beatdown House" of from whom footwork originated.

Other early proponents of the genre included DJ Roc and DJ Nate.

During the 2000s, footwork relied heavily in its distribution on a peer-to-peer mixtape exchange in Chicago public schools, which is why the earliest works in the genre are often hard to obtain. Other channels producers used around that time for distribution of their tracks included free-to-use media sharing platforms of the day, for instance now-closed imeem.com, MySpace and YouTube. Some of the earliest tracks of footwork/juke only gained exposure after European labels started re-releasing them throughout the 2010s.

Around 2007 footwork/juke gained some brief exposure on MTV and the Internet, with the release of such tracks as Kanye West's  remix "Pro Nails" by Chicagoan rapper Kid Sister (2007), which showcased half-time/full-time tempo switch, typical for the genre, albeit at a slower tempo. Another example was Twista's footwork/juke track Pimp Like Me from his 2007 album Adrenaline Rush 2007 produced by Cuzzo and Tight Mike, which also gained airplay on MTV Video. Music video for Pimp Like Me also featured scenes of footwork dancing.

Radio station Afropop Worldwide remarked on the genre and its developments in 2011, saying that:

In 2014, one of the most well-recognized figures in footwork and the leader of Teklife, DJ Rashad, died of drug overdose, shortly after releasing a critically acclaimed footwork/juke album Double Cup on Hyperdub. This has put a strain on genre's development, particularly in Chicago, where at the same time youth started to prefer to listen to drill music instead. However, as 
DJ Taye of Teklife and RP Boo noted, footwork, at the time it was declining in Chicago, found new exposure elsewhere in the world, particularly in Europe. After 2013, RP Boo toured worldwide so much that he could afford to quit his full-time job in home repair store in Chicago, something he could not afford doing during footwork's formative years.

Characteristics
Footwork/juke songs are generally around 150–165 BPM with beat-skipping kick drums, pounding rapidly (and at times very sparsely) in syncopation with crackling snares, claps, and other sounds reminiscent of old drum machines. The overall feel of the rhythm in more experimental tracks in the genre may sound intentionally undanceable for a casual listener. Vocal chops from unrelated genres, such and contemporary R&B and pop music are common and may also be up- or down-pitched. The production style is often markedly lo-fi, much like baile funk.

The tempo of footwork/juke tracks may switch back and forth, alternating hi-speed full-time and half-time sections. The overall mood of the genre is said to be hypnotic, dark and abstract. The genre makes marked heavy use of sub-bass and its fast and repetitive rhythmic atmosphere is said to be reminiscent of the early jungle music.

International growth

Europe

In Europe, juke has been popular in European clubs, particularly in Paris, Brussels, and Spain for years. UK label Planet Mu's compilations Bangs and Works Volume 1 (2010) and Bangs and Works Volume 2 (2011) have brought the work of Chicago DJs to a wider audience, drawing some media attention and becoming the first internationally recognized juke compilations. The liner notes for Vol. 1 noted:

Apart from Bangs and Works, Planet Mu has also been releasing original albums by Chicago footwork artists, for example Da Trax Antology by DJ Nate (2010), which are oftentimes sourced from shelved tracks from the 2000s Myspace and imeem.com era.

The Hyperdub label has been a supporter of juke music, releasing much of DJ Rashad's material.
Deeon has released two projects on the famous French Ghetto music label Booty Call Records in 2013

The early attempt to emulate juke sound in Europe was the infamous "Footcrab" by Addison Groove, coming out in 2010 on Loefah's SWAMP 81 label. "Footcrab" took inspiration from footwork, however the sound of "Footcrab" was slowed down to match the tempo of UK bass genres, around 140 BPM. "Footcrab" drew some criticism to be parting ways from the raw nature of juke roots in Chicago and only emulating the sound of juke on a "child-like" surface level and the production on "Footcrab" was deemed "cheap". Nothwithstanding the criticism, "Footcrab" put Addison Groove on forefront of the UK Bass scene in the United Kingdom. His subsequent full-length album called Transistor Rhythm released on Modeselector's 50 Weapons label, while retaining the influence of footwork, shifted more to the earlier days of the genre and to the sound of its immediate predecessor, ghetto house, including ravey synths at much slower tempos that footwork, around 120–140 BPM. However, the album was also met with mixed to negative reviews.

Apart from isolated releases like those by Addison Groove and handful of others, footwork/juke did not meet wide native acceptance in the United Kingdom. Mike Paradinas, the head of Planet Mu label explained this  by making two points: first, in his words, was that British party culture is markedly different – relying on illegal substances and drinking – it would have hard time to catch on rather athletic footwork dancing, and second, in his words, is that historically British artists were generally reluctant to appropriate whole cultures, instead trying to either make their own domestic trends or to add a distinct spin to an existing culture, the thing that did not happen to footwork in Britain.

Japan

Beginnings
In contrast with Britain, Japan, according to Mike Paradinas, did not hesitate to appropriate western subcultures in their entirety, and that was the reason why in Japan footwork/juke sprung to become, over the 2010s, one of the dominant electronic dance music genres, paired with the burgeoning footwork dancing scene, with competitions and tournaments.

DJ Fulltono from Osaka is credited as a first notable pioneer of footwork/juke in Japan. He started bringing footwork/juke into his mixes around 2008, two years prior to the release of the first compilation from Bangs and Works series on Planet Mu, and at the time, the dominant types of electronic dance music in Japan were house and techno timing at around 120 to 130 BPM, and drum'n'bass, at around 170–175 BPM, so at first dancing crowds in Japan were confused and deemed footwork as "too fast" for their palate. However, with time they have built tolerance to the DJ sounds of DJ Fulltono. It took Japanese producers and listeners almost a decade to adapt to juke, but around 2018 the footwork scene of Japan was noted to be among the most vibrant electronic dance music scenes in the country, incorporating disparate additional influences into sound, such as vocaloids, otaku culture, Japanese rock, reggae, funk, chiptune music and wonky music, thus innovating in the genre.

Another notable influence on the formation of Japanese footwork/juke scene was Japanese ghettotech scene, movement led by DJ April and DJ Go, among others. DJ Fulltono, apart from being footwork pioneer in Japan, was (and continues to be) an important DJ in Japanese ghettotech scene as well, around the time he started popularizing footwork in Japan.

The first Japanese juke label, called Booty Tune was set up by DJ Fulltono in 2008, initially to release his own tracks, but gradually became an imprint under which other domestic juke artists started to release their tracks. After that, more Japanese footwork labels appeared, namely Japanese Mutation Bootyism (which released important Japanese Juke and Footworks Compilation), Kool Switch Works and Dubliminal Bounce (by Japanese footwork producer Skip Club Orchestra).

The scene in Japan received support from Chicago scene on several occasions. Many founding fathers of juke toured Japan, many of the events were as well organized by DJ Fulltono. Most Japanese footwork producers who were interviewed by Bandcamp named footwork producer Traxman from Chicago and Bangs and Works as their primary sources of inspiration. In return, Traxman released a full album of remixes of his tracks, where remixes were made exclusively by Japanese producers.

In 2018, THUMP released a video documentary on Japanese juke and footwork scene.

Footwork dance in Japan
The genre also sparked interest in footwork dancing and that gave birth to Battle Train Tokyo footwork dancing competition held in Tokyo. It has even been suggested that around that time the number of footwork dancers in Japan was increasing faster than the number of actual Japanese footwork producers.

Subgenres and artists
Plenty of experimentation happened in the Japanese juke scene over the years. For instance, some of the releases in Omoide label catalogue kickstarted the so-called vocaloid juke by combining footwork music with vocaloids. Other producers incorporated influence from wonky music.

Another homegrown subgenre of juke in Japan is party-juke, which is a fusion of hip hop rapping over footwork backing tracks. Originally, in Chicago, producers mostly eschewed rappers, using vocal sample chops instead, but in Japan party-juke became its own subculture with wider footwork/juke subculture. The subgenre of party-juke had its first moment with the release of 160or80 compilation in 2013, according to Japanese ghettotech and footwork veteran producer DJ April.

The influence of Japanese rock on Japanese juke and vice versa was so pronounced, that well-known rock music nights in Tokyo called SHINJUKO ROCKS started hosting juke parties.

Notable Japanese footwork artists include DJ Fulltono, Gnyonpix, who introduced gameboy music influence into juke, Paisley Parks production trio, DJ Dike (along with his Oneday Recs. label), bringing influence of reggae and dancehall horn sections into footwork, Oyubi, CRZKNY, Boogie Mann, bringing influence of funk, boogie and acid house into footwork,  KΣITO, PERCEPTION, Haya6Go, DJ Aflow, Uncle Texx, Picnic Women, Foodman, and others.

Among other notable labels that release footwork/juke in Japan, stand Shinkaron label and Ghost label (run by Paisley Parks).

Social impact
Japanese juke scene was also politically outspoken on the topic of nuclear energy in Japan, particularly after the 2011 Tohoku tsunami disaster, taking opposing stance. The annual Atomic Bomb Compilation of juke music, released by Hiroshima footwork producer CRZKNY (with the idea originating from another footwork producer from Japan, Gnyonpix) protests both nuclear warfare proliferation and nuclear energy proliferation. At first, the compilation only included Japanese producers, alluding mainly to Fukushima disaster and bombing of Hiroshima and Nagasaki, but as time went on, it started including juke producers from around the world, for instance from Mexico, Poland and from the United States.

Japanese juke scene is also noted to serve as a refuge from the relatively strict corporate culture in Japan, with many producers coming from middle-class working white-collar jobs by day and thus it would be nearly to impossible for them to communicate with each other, having different positions in social hierarchy, if not for footwork, which has liberalizing effect on those who participate in the scene.

Latin America

Around the second half of the 2010s, juke brought attention in Latin America and Brazil. In 2017, Mexico-based JukeMX footwork producer collective, consisting of producers Eric Uh, Sonido Berzerk, Ma Fuego, Spacetrilla and others, released Traxmex compilation series, showcasing local improvements of the original genre, like, introducing Latin percussion and samples from baile funk into footwork. Another noted footwork producer collective is Ten Toes Turbo.

In Brazil, producer Cesrv, founder of local Beatwise Recordings label, included juke tracks into South release.

In the southern part of South America, Argentinian footwork label ABBYSS brought attention by releasing Foodworks series of compilations, consisting of local footwork tracks, since 2015. In Chile around that time, the MakinMovs netlabel was releasing juke compilations, which also included tracks by footwork producers from Mexico, Argentina and Peru.

In Peru, a local Matraca netlabel released Lima Footwork compilation in 2017, consisting of tracks of Matraca resident producers, such as Dr.100, Rashid from Lima, Lukrø, and others. Later, in 2019, Lukrø collaborated with New York City-based juke producer Regent Street, to produce a glitch and reggaeton inspired track called Fire.

Dance
Footwork dance somewhat predates footwork/juke music and started as a dance to house music, with elements of breakdancing, on the west side of Chicago in the mid/late 1980s, eventually spreading to the south side and inspiring its own genre eponymous genre of music.

The dance involves complex fast movement of the feet with accompanying twists and turns, and usually takes place as part of a "battle". The upper side of the body, in contrast, stays mostly unmoved. Most movements in the footwork dance happen below the knees. The style was popularized outside Chicago by inclusion in the music video for Dude 'n Nem's 2007 single "Watch My Feet".

See also
 RP Boo
 DJ Rashad
 Ghetto house
 Chicago stepping
 The Era (dance crew)

References

Street dance
Music of Chicago
American music
Japanese styles of music
Electronic dance music genres